Debra L. Kiel (born 1957) is an American farmer and politician serving in the Minnesota House of Representatives since 2011. A member of the Republican Party of Minnesota, Kiel represents District 1B in northwest Minnesota, which includes the cities of Crookston and East Grand Forks and Norman, Polk, Clay and Red Lake Counties.

Early life, education, and career
Kiel was born and raised south of Crookston. She graduated from Crookston High School, then attended Concordia College in Moorhead. She was a member of the Crookston School Board for seven years, serving as the board's chair and treasurer. Kiel and her husband are sugar beet farmers.

Minnesota House of Representatives
Kiel was elected to the House in 2010, unseating longtime DFL incumbent Bernard Lieder, and has been reelected every two years since. In 2015-16, Kiel served as an assistant majority leader. During the 2017-18 legislative session, she chaired the Subcommittee on Aging and Long-Term Care, a subcommittee of the Health and Human Services Reform Committee. Kiel serves as the minority lead of the Human Services Policy Committee and serves on the Health and Ethics Committees.

Electoral Results

Personal life
Kiel married her husband, Lonn, in 1977. They have four children and 12 grandchildren. Kiel is active at her home church, Our Savior’s Lutheran, where she sings in the choir, teaches Sunday school, has served as the youth group leader, and taught music in Our Saviors’ Lutheran school. She helps with the Knowledge Bowl group at Crookston Public School. She is on the SPOKES group for the Villa St Vincent Foundation. Lonn ran three unsuccessful campaigns against Bernard Lieder before Deb unseated him. Her great-grandfather, John Perry, a Crookston farmer, represented Polk County in the Minnesota House during the 1921-22 biennium.

References

External links

 Rep. Kiel Web Page
 Project Votesmart - Rep. Debra Kiel Profile
 Debra Kiel Campaign Web Site

1957 births
Living people
People from Crookston, Minnesota
Republican Party members of the Minnesota House of Representatives
Women state legislators in Minnesota
Concordia College (Moorhead, Minnesota) alumni
21st-century American politicians
21st-century American women politicians